Diego Nicolás Gutiérrez Zúñiga (born February 18, 1997) is a Canadian professional soccer player who plays as a midfielder for Valour FC.

Early life
Gutiérrez was born to Chilean parents in Greenfield Park, Quebec in Canada and moved to Santiago in Chile when he was three years old. He began playing soccer at age five in the Colo-Colo academy. Afterwards, he joined the youth setup of Palestino.

Club career
On November 6, 2015, Gutiérrez made his senior league debut for Palestino against Deportes Antofagasta. He departed the club in March 2019.

In March 2019, Gutiérrez signed a deal with Canadian Premier League club Valour FC. After the season, the club exercised his option for the 2020 season.

In March 2021, Gutiérrez returned to Chile, signing with Primera B side Barnechea.

In December 2021, Gutiérrez returned for a second spell at Valour FC for the 2022 season.

International career
Eligible to represent both Canada and Chile internationally, Gutiérrez was called up to the Chile U20 team in June 2016 for a pair of friendlies against Paraguay. However, he did not play in either match.

In January 2017, Gutiérrez was called up to a camp for the Canadian U20 team for the first time. He made his debut against the Panama U20 in a friendly on January 20. He subsequently made the roster for the 2017 CONCACAF U-20 Championship, where he made two appearances.

Personal life
His twin brother Cristián is also a professional soccer player.

Honours
Palestino
Copa Chile: 2018

References

External links

1997 births
Living people
Soccer people from Quebec
Sportspeople from Longueuil
Canadian people of Chilean descent
Sportspeople of Chilean descent
Canadian soccer players
Canada men's youth international soccer players
Citizens of Chile through descent
Chilean footballers
Colo-Colo footballers
Club Deportivo Palestino footballers
Valour FC players
A.C. Barnechea footballers
Chilean Primera División players
Canadian Premier League players
Primera B de Chile players
Association football midfielders
Naturalized citizens of Chile
Canadian twins
Chilean twins
Twin sportspeople